Julio Arango (born 6 June 1950) is a Colombian former swimmer. He competed at the 1964 Summer Olympics and the 1968 Summer Olympics. He finished third in the 1967 Pan American Games 200 metres freestyle event.

References

External links
 

1950 births
Living people
Colombian male freestyle swimmers
Olympic swimmers of Colombia
Swimmers at the 1964 Summer Olympics
Swimmers at the 1968 Summer Olympics
Swimmers at the 1967 Pan American Games
Pan American Games bronze medalists for Colombia
Sportspeople from Valle del Cauca Department
Pan American Games medalists in swimming
Medalists at the 1967 Pan American Games
20th-century Colombian people
21st-century Colombian people